Wai Lana Yoga  is an instructional yoga television series that has been airing on public television stations nationwide since 1998. It is distributed by American Public Television.

Host
It is hosted by "Wai Lana", who was interviewed on Inside Edition on 8 May 2007. She has also produced a musical cartoon.

Her "Namaste" music video was played in the United Nations in 2015 to celebrate International Yoga Day.

Her real name is Hui Lan Zhang or Zhang Hui Lan and she is one of only two Chinese nationals to win the Padma Shri Award, which she got in 2016.

Episodes
It includes seven seasons of twenty-six episodes for a total of 182.

Season 1
101 Anyone Can Do It
102 Arch and Relax
103 Upside Down & Rock'n Roll
104 Back and Forth and Roar
105 Alternate Nostril Breathing
106 Cats and Fish
107 Balance Your Buttocks 
108 Stretch Those Strings
109 Neti (Sinus and Nasal Cleaning)
110 Sooth Your Nerves
111 Dive In!
112 Energy Charge Breathing
113 The King of Asanas
114 Rock & Roll
115 The Crunch Alternative
116 The Lion
117 Striking Cobra and Headstand
118 Snap, Crackle & Pop
119 Plough In and Breathe!
120 Ben, Twist and Balance
121 Expand The Chest and Breathe
122 Bend You Backbone
123 Bend, Twist and Release Tension
124 Yoga Basics
125 The Queen of Asanas
126 Let's Tone Up!

Season 2
201 Tension Spots
202 Leg Work
203 Get a Head Start
204 Hamstrings
205 Body, Mind, and Breath
206 Healthy Joints for a Healthy Body
207 Salute to the Sun (Part 1)
208 Salute to the Sun (Part 2)
209 Salute to the Sun (Part 3)
210 Salute to the Sun (Part 4)
211 Release, Arch, and Stretch
212 Stretch, Tone, and Salute
213 Stretch Your Back
214 Abs-Strengthening Leg Exercises
215 Salute to the Sun
216 Keep Your Balance!
217 Abs and Thighs
218 Sit a While
219 Breathe Away Your Stress
220 Do It All!
221 Tone Your Back
222 Stiff Knees and Tight Shoulders?
223 Reach for the Sky
224 Complete Yoga Breathing
225 Netia Cleansing Technique
226 Spinal Fluidity

Season 3
301 A Healthy Appetite
302 Strong as a Tree, Lithe as a Snake
303 Stiffness Be Gone!
304 Stretch Out Stubborn Knots
305 Easy Stretches for Everyone
306 Loosen Your Legs for Lotus
307 Balance with Poise
308 Special: Preventing Back Problems
309 Cat Stretching
310 Juice Up Your Innards
311 Shoulder Stuff
312 Legs, Legs, Legs
313 Close Your Nose
314 Tight Shoulders, Tight Neck
315 No More Headaches
316 The Importance of Breath
317 Ketchari Mudra
318 Steady Now!
319 Variations on the Classics
320 Cooling Breath
321 Stretch Your Legs
322 Yoga at the Office
323 Terrific Triangle
324 Energize!
325 Get the Kinks Out
326 Soothing Twist

Season 4
401 Bye Bye Bulges
402 Yoga Glow
403 Stand Tall
404 Chin Lock
405 Lift and Tone
406 Yoga for Vitality
407 Back Relief
408 Shake A Leg
409 Royal Flush
410 Breath Is The Key
411 Nerves Frayed
412 Cradle Rock
413 Sports Protection
414 Terrific Triangle Twist
415 Tummy Tighteners
416 Stick 'em Up!
417 Rise and Shine!
418 Agnisar Kriya
419 Pain in the Neck?
420 Shrug Off Shoulder Tension
421 Torso Twist Toes Touch
422 Legs Up!
423 Cut Abs with Scissors
424 The Sacrum Rock
425 Cannonball
426 Side-Lying Stretch

Season 5
501 Tip-Top Trio
502 Ungirdle Your Shoulders
503 Special: Constipation Begone!
504 Good Vibrations
505 Breathe Easy!
506 Get The Edge with Yoga
507 Focus: Arms and Legs
508 Energize Your Spine!
509 Two-Hand Snake
510 Banish Lower Back Pain
511 Enjoy Supple Joints
512 Easy Stress Relief
513 Loose Legs, Loose Hips
514 Chakra Breathing
515 Duck Walking
516 Bellows Breath
517 The Thigh Bone's Connected to the Hip Bone
518 Special: Pregnancy - Part 1
519 Special: Pregnancy - Part 2
520 Special: Pregnancy - Part 3
521 Special: Recovery from Childbirth - Part 1
522 Special: Recovery from Childbirth - Part 2
523 Upside Down Flow
524 Crane Balance
525 Exercise Your Eyes
526 Spinal Spiral

Season 6
601 Lengthen & Strengthen
602 Shake Your Legs
603 Easy Plough
604 Stay Cool
605 Yoga Dance
606 Twisting Cobra
607 Strength & Balance
608 Tadagi Mudra
609 Better Backs
610 Exhilaration!
611 Breathe and Meditate
612 Galloping Horse, Arching Tiger
613 Arch & Bend
614 Flex Your Feet
615 Plough Twist
616 Bow Your Back
617 Hamstring Balance
618 Ab-Sense
619 Energize with the Sun
620 Shoulderstand Fun
621 Lizard, Locust, & Flapping Fish
622 Renew Your Energy
623 Forward Folds
624 Rocking Bow
625 Hold Your Toes!
626 Seven-Stage Spinal Stretch

Season 7
701 Crane Poses
702 Lower Back Special (Part 1)
703 Lower Back Special (Part 2)
704 Un-Knot Your Neck
705 Lean On It! (Part 1)
706 Lean On It! (Part 2)
707 Dynamic Combo Rolls
708 Ease Into It!
709 Perfect Posture
710 Threaded Twist
711 Special: High Blood Pressure
712 Lengthen Your Legs
713 Special: Chair Poses
714 Stand Strong
715 Butterfly Shoulderstand
716 Backbend Boons
717 Lunge!
718 Animal Poses
719 Special: Hemorrhoids
720 Lotus
721 Toes & Palms Balance
722 Special: Blankets
723 Perfect Partners
724 Lord of the Dance
725 Topsy Turvy
726 Supply Sides

References

PBS original programming
2008 American television series debuts
Yoga mass media